SS John Catron was a Liberty ship built in the United States during World War II. She was named after John Catron, an Associate Justice of the Supreme Court of the United States.

Construction
John Catron was laid down on 3 September 1942, under a Maritime Commission (MARCOM) contract, MC hull 1494, by J.A. Jones Construction, Brunswick, Georgia, and launched on 11 July 1943.

History
She was allocated to American Foreign Steamship Corporation, on 31 July 1943. On 30 August 1949, she entered the National Defense Reserve Fleet in Mobile, Alabama. She was sold to Andy Equipment, Inc., Houston, Texas, on 9 November 1971, and delivered for scrapping on 10 December 1971.

References

Bibliography

 
 
 
 
 

 

Liberty ships
Ships built in Brunswick, Georgia
1943 ships
Mobile Reserve Fleet